Pablo y Andrea is a Mexican children's telenovela produced by Lucero Suárez for Televisa in 2005. Pablo y Andrea is an adaptation of the classic The Adventures of Tom Sawyer by Mark Twain. The adventures are not developed on the coast of the Mississippi River, but in the magical town of Huasca de Ocampo in the Mexican state of Hidalgo.

It was the last children's telenovela produced by Televisa, the lack of interest of the public with novels generated lower-rated audience. Scenes were cut from the original broadcast in order to reduce the 100 episodes to 75 because of the low ratings.

On August 1, 2005, Canal de las Estrellas started broadcasting Pablo y Andrea weekdays at 4:00pm, replacing Sueños y caramelos. The last episode was broadcast on November 11, 2005 with Peregrina replacing it.

Marcia Coutiño and Guillermo Capetillo starred as adult protagonists, Danna Paola and Jorge Trejo starred as young protagonists, while Mercedes Molto, Eduardo Rivera, María Fernanda Núñez, Adrián Alonso, Valentina Cuenca and Geraldine Galván starred as antagonists.

Cast 
 
Guillermo Capetillo as Juan Carlos Saavedra
Marcia Coutiño as Carmen
Mercedes Molto as Carlota/Úrsula/Bárbara/Socorro Barraza
Jorge Trejo as Pablo Ibáñez
Danna Paola as Andrea Saavedra
Ingrid Martz as Alma
Jesús Zavala as Nicolás
Geraldine Galván as Hilda
Nadiedka as Mati
Rodrigo Llamas as Pepe
Valentina Cuenca as Rita
Valeria López as Susana "Susanita"
Adrián Alonso as Martín Ibáñez
María Fernanda Núñez as Diana
Beng Zeng as Joaquín
Carlos Espejel as Tobías
Zully Keith as Virginia Slater
Carol Sevilla as Nicole Slater
Juan Carlos Colombo as Sabás
Nuria Bages as Gertrudis Ibáñez
Eduardo Rivera as Míkonos
Mario Casillas as Don Severino
Adalberto Parra as Quintero
Raquel Morell as Ellen Slater
Rodrigo Mejía as Rodrigo Castro
Jorge Ortín as Cirilo Frutos
Carlos Ignacio as Abelardo
Luis Gimeno as Don Cipriano Saavedra
Lupe Vázquez as Tiba
Loreli Mancilla as Laura
Bárbara Gómez as Concepción "Conchita"
René Azcoitia as Father Bonifacio
Anastasia as Paula
Alan Ledesma as Osvaldo
Rafael Perrín as Mateo
Luis Camarena as Anacleto
Jaime Lozano as Francisco "Pancho" Ortíz
Luis Reynoso as Jesús
Thelma Tixou as Leonor
Arturo Lorca as Pielinsky
Juan Imperio as Moctezuma
Maripaz García as Toña
Iliana de la Garza as Lupe
Javier Ruán as Imanol
Bodokito as Chana

Awards

References

External links

 at esmas.com 

2005 telenovelas
Mexican telenovelas
2005 Mexican television series debuts
2005 Mexican television series endings
Spanish-language telenovelas
Television series about children
Television shows set in Mexico
Televisa telenovelas
Children's telenovelas